Kumara Dhatusena was King of Anuradhapura in the 6th century, whose reign lasted from 515 to 524. He succeeded his father Moggallana I as King of Anuradhapura and was succeeded by his son Kittisena.

See also 

 Kumaradasa, a poet sometimes identified with Kumara Dhatusena
 List of Sri Lankan monarchs
 History of Sri Lanka

References

External links
 Kings & Rulers of Sri Lanka
 Codrington's Short History of Ceylon

Monarchs of Anuradhapura
K
K
K